Alcée (or Alcee) is a given name. Notable people with the given name include:

People
 Alcée Chriss III, American organist, composer, and conductor
 Alcée Fortier (1856–1914) American professor of languages in New Orleans, Louisiana
 Alcée Fortier High School, a former high school in Uptown New Orleans, Louisiana
 Alcee Hastings (1936–2021), American politician and judge; U.S. Congressman from Florida
 Alcée Louis la Branche (1806–1861), American politician; U.S. Congressman from Louisiana

Fictional characters
 Alcée, fictional character in Kate Chopin's short stories "At the Cadian Ball" (1892) and "The Storm" (1898)
 Alcée Arobin, fictional character in Kate Chopin's novel The Awakening (1899)